Waldburg-Capustigall was a Stewardship of the House of Waldburg – later a County – located in East Prussia. Waldburg-Capustigall was a partition of Waldburg-Trauchburg and was raised to a County in 1686, before being annexed by the Kingdom of Prussia in 1745.

Rulers of Waldburg-Capustigall

Stewards of Waldburg-Capustigall 
 Johannes Jakob, 1554–1585
 Wolfgang Heinrich, 1585–1637
 Johannes Albert, 1637–1655
 Abraham, 1637–1638
 Wolfgang Christoph (Reichsgraf 1686), 1643–1688
 Karl Ludwig, 1685–1738
 Joachim Heinrich, 1655–1703
 Friedrich Sebastian Wunibald, 1677–1745
 Wolfgang Christoph, 1643–1686 (raised to Reichsgraf)

Counts of Waldburg-Capustigall 
 Wolfgang Christoph, 1686–1688
 Joachim Heinrich, 1655–1703
 Otto Wilhelm I, 1703–1725
 Karl Friedrich, 1703–1722
 Otto Wilhelm II, 1725–1745

1504 establishments in the Holy Roman Empire
1745 disestablishments in the Holy Roman Empire